Sepia sokotriensis is a species of cuttlefish native to the western Indian Ocean, specifically off Sokotra Island, and probably east Africa. It lives at depths to 100 m.

Sepia sokotriensis grows to a mantle length of 80 mm.

The type specimen was collected near Sokotra Island in the Arabian Sea. It is deposited at the Zoological Museum in Moscow.

References

External links

Cuttlefish
Molluscs described in 1988